Ellinjaa is a rural locality in the Tablelands Region, Queensland, Australia.

Geography 
The land use is almost entirely grazing, on a mixture of native vegetation and modified pastures.

History 
The name of the locality probably derives from nearby Ellinjaa Creek and Ellinjaa Falls.

Brook's Road State School opened on circa 1927 and closed on 1954. It was on the east side of the Palmerston Highway at approx .

Education 
There are no schools in Ellinjaa. The nearest primary school is Millaa Millaa State School in neighbouring Millaa Millaa to the west. The nearest secondary school is Malanda State High School in Malanda to the north.

References 

Tablelands Region
Localities in Queensland